"Do It Again" is the third single from Australian singer Cassie Davis' debut album Differently. The song was co written and produced by LA based Dreamlab songwriter/producer duo, Leah Haywood (former Sony Music Australian artist) and Daniel James.

The video for "Do It Again" was shot on location in Sydney at Fox Studio 1, directed by Toby Angwin and shot by Simon Ozolins (Empire of the Sun).

The song was the #1 most added track to the radio in its debut week of release.

Release
The single was released physically and digitally on 7 August 2009. It officially began radio airplay on 10 July 2009.

Track listing 

The iTunes digital EP includes an additional remix; "Differently" (El Cubano Remix).
Another remix, titled "Differently" (O'Lucky Remix), is available for purchase on Cassie Davis' official 'bandit' page.

Charts

Weekly charts

Year-end charts

References

2009 singles
Cassie Davis songs
Songs written by Leah Haywood
Songs written by Daniel James (record producer)
2009 songs